Blondie Brings Up Baby is a 1939 American comedy film directed by Frank R. Strayer and starring Penny Singleton, Arthur Lake, Larry Simms. It is the fourth of 28 films based on the comic strip.

Plot summary
Blondie is convinced by a salesman that Baby Dumpling is a genius with an IQ of 168,  She enrolls him in kindergarten where he immediately gets into a fight resulting in a black eye.  Later, Baby Dumpling skips school to play with Daisy.  Blondie and Dagwood report to the police that Baby Dumpling and Daisy are missing.  Meanwhile, Daisy is picked up by the dog catcher and taken to the pound where she is adopted by the nurse of a rich little girl who uses a wheelchair.  Baby Dumpling spots Daisy inside the gates of the mansion and begins to play with Daisy and the girl.  They are spotted.  While adults argue about letting the children play together, Baby Dumpling and the little girl wander off with Daisy.  The children are found playing on a swing where the little girl demonstrates she has been encouraged to walk.  The nurse states, "Weak children can be taught by strong children and strong children learn compassion."

Dagwood shows his architectural model to the girl's father who decides to purchase the building.  As a result, Dagwood, who had been fired by Mr. Dithers earlier, is promised a nice bonus.

Cast
 Penny Singleton as Blondie
 Arthur Lake as Dagwood
 Larry Simms as Baby Dumpling
 Daisy, also known as Spooks, as Daisy the Dog
 Danny Mummert as Alvin Fuddle
 Jonathan Hale as J.C. Dithers
 Robert Middlemass as Abner Cartwright
 Olin Howland as Encyclopedia Salesman
 Fay Helm as Mrs. Fuddle
 Peggy Ann Garner as Melinda Mason
 Roy Gordon as Mr. Mason
 Grace Stafford as Miss White
 Helen Jerome Eddy as Miss Ferguson
 Irving Bacon as Mailman

References

External links
 
 
 
 

1939 films
Columbia Pictures films
American black-and-white films
Blondie (film series) films
1939 comedy films
Films directed by Frank R. Strayer
Films scored by Leigh Harline
1930s American films